The Pinta Island tortoise (Chelonoidis niger ), also known as the Pinta giant tortoise, Abingdon Island tortoise, or Abingdon Island giant tortoise, is an extinct subspecies of Galápagos tortoise native to Ecuador's Pinta Island.

The subspecies was described by Albert Günther in 1877 after specimens arrived in London. By the end of the 19th century, most of the Pinta Island tortoises had been wiped out due to hunting. By the mid-20th century, the subspecies was assumed to be extinct until a single male was discovered on the island in 1971. Efforts were made to mate the male, named Lonesome George, with other subspecies, but no viable eggs resulted. Lonesome George died on 24 June 2012, and the subspecies was believed to have become extinct with his death. However, 17 first-generation hybrids were reported in 2012 from Wolf Volcano on Isabela Island during a trip by Yale University researchers. As these specimens were juveniles, their parents might still be alive. The subspecies is classified as extinct on the IUCN Red List.

Taxonomy
 
Lonesome George, along with other of the tortoises on Pinta Island, belonged to a species of 15 subspecies. Giant tortoises were once found on all of the continents except Australia and Antarctica. The Galápagos tortoises remain the largest living tortoises.

The Pinta Island tortoise was originally described in 1877 by German-born British herpetologist Albert Günther, who named it Testudo abingdonii in his book The Gigantic Land-tortoises (Living and Extinct) in the Collection of the British Museum. The name abingdonii derives from Abingdon Island, now more commonly known as Pinta Island. The knowledge of its existence was derived from short statements of the voyages of Captain James Colnett in 1798 and Basil Hall in 1822. In 1876, Commander William Cookson brought three male specimens (along with other subspecies of Galápagos tortoise) to London aboard the Royal Navy ship HMS Peterel.

Synonyms of Chelonoidis abingdonii include Testudo abingdonii Günther, 1877; Testudo elephantopus abingdonii Mertens & Wermuth, 1955; Geochelone elephantopus abingdonii Pritchard, 1967; Geochelone nigra abingdonii Iverson, 1992; and Geochelone abingdonii Valverde, 2004.

Evolution
The origin and systematic relationships are still unresolved today; they captivated Charles Darwin himself. DNA sequencing results indicate that the three best candidates for the closest living relative of the Galápagos tortoises all come from South America. They are the yellow-footed tortoise (Geochelone denticulata), the red-footed tortoise (Geochelone carbonaria), and the Chaco tortoise (Geochelone chilensis).

Behaviour and ecology
In the wild, Galápagos tortoises, including the Pinta Island subspecies, rest about 16 hours a day. Galápagos tortoises are herbivores, feeding primarily on greens, grasses, native fruit, and cactus pads. They drink large quantities of water, which they can then store in their bodies for long periods of time for later use. They can reportedly survive up to six months without food or water.

For breeding, the tortoises were most active during the hot season (January to May). During the cool season (June to November), female tortoises migrated to nesting zones to lay their eggs.

Galápagos giant tortoises represent the top herbivores in the Galápagos, and as such they shape the entire island ecosystem. They provide critical ecosystem services by dispersing seeds and by acting as ecological engineers through herbivory and nutrient cycling. The extinction of the Pinta Island tortoise has diminished the functioning of the island ecosystem.

Relationship with humans

Threats and conservation
Several of the surviving subspecies of Galápagos tortoises are endangered. The decline of the population began in the 17th century as a result of visits by buccaneers and whalers. They hunted tortoises as a source of fresh meat, taking about 200,000 tortoises altogether.

In 1958, goats were brought to Pinta Island and began eating much of the vegetation, to the detriment of the natural habitat.
A prolonged effort to exterminate the goats was begun. As the goat populations declined, the vegetation recovered. Small trees began regenerating from the stumps left by the goats. Highland shrub subspecies, forest tree seedlings, Opuntia cactus, and other endemic subspecies increased. In 2003, Pinta Island was declared goat-free.

In addition to conservation efforts such as the elimination of goat populations in the Galápagos, there has been an effort to revive a number of subspecies of Galápagos tortoise through captive breeding. Future efforts may aim to recreate a population genetically similar to the original Pinta Island tortoise by breeding the first-generation hybrids discovered on Wolf Volcano.

Lonesome George

The last known individual of the subspecies was a male named Lonesome George, who died on 24 June 2012. In his last years, he was known as the rarest creature in the world. George served as a potent symbol for conservation efforts in the Galápagos and internationally.

George was first seen on the island of Pinta on 1 December 1971 by Hungarian malacologist József Vágvölgyi. Relocated for his safety to the Charles Darwin Research Station on Santa Cruz Island, George was penned with two females of different subspecies. Although the females laid eggs, none hatched. The Pinta tortoise was pronounced functionally extinct.

Over the decades, all attempts at mating Lonesome George were unsuccessful, possibly because his subspecies was not cross-fertile with the other subspecies.

On 24 June 2012, at 8:00 am local time, Director of the Galápagos National Park Edwin Naula announced that Lonesome George had been found dead by his caretaker of 40 years, Fausto Llerena. Naula suspects that the cause of death was heart failure consistent with the end of the natural life of a tortoise.

Possible remaining individuals
In 2006, Peter Pritchard, one of the world's foremost authorities on Galápagos tortoises, suggested that a male tortoise residing in the Prague Zoo might be a Pinta Island tortoise due to his shell structure. Subsequent DNA analysis, however, revealed that it was more likely to be from Pinzón Island, home of the subspecies C. duncanensis.

Whalers and pirates in the past used Isabela Island, the central and largest of the Galápagos Islands, as a tortoise dumping ground. Today, the remaining tortoises that live around Wolf Volcano have combined genetic markers from several subspecies.

In May 2007, analysis of genomic microsatellites (DNA sequences) suggested that individuals from a translocated group of C. abingdonii may still exist in the wild on Isabela. Researchers identified one male tortoise from the Wolf Volcano region that had half its genes in common with George's subspecies. This animal is believed to be a first-generation hybrid between the subspecies of the islands Isabela and Pinta. This suggests the possibility of a pure Pinta tortoise among the 2,000 tortoises on Isabela.

A subsequent trip to Isabela by Yale University researchers found 17 first-generation hybrids living at Wolf Volcano. The researchers planned to return to Isabela in the spring of 2013 to look for surviving Pinta tortoises and to try to collect hybrids in an effort to start a captive selective-breeding program and to hopefully reintroduce Pintas back to their native island.

In 2020, the Galápagos national park and Galápagos Conservancy announced that they had discovered one young female with a direct line of descent from the Chelonoidis abingdonii subspecies of Pinta island.

See also
Holocene extinction
List of subspecies of Galápagos tortoise

References
Notes

Bibliography

Giant Tortoises, Galapagos Conservancy
Recovery of a nearly extinct Galápagos tortoise despite minimal genetic variation., Wiley Online Library

External links

Naked Scientists audio discussion of Lonesome George
Article on Lonesome George The giant tortoise of Galapagos Island.
Lonesome George, by Vicky Seal

Chelonoidis
Subspecies
Endemic reptiles of the Galápagos Islands
Extinct animals of South America
Extinct turtles
Reptile extinctions since 1500
Reptiles described in 1877
Taxa named by Albert Günther